Simchat Beit Hashoevah or Simchas Beis Hashoeiva (lit. "Rejoicing of the Water-Drawing House") is a special celebration held by  Jews during the Intermediate days of Sukkot.

Origin
When the Temple in Jerusalem stood, a unique service was performed every morning throughout the Sukkot holiday: the Nisukh HaMayim (lit. "Pouring of the water") or Water Libation Ceremony. According to the Talmud, Sukkot is the time of year in which God judges the world for rainfall; therefore this ceremony, like the taking of the Four Species, invokes God's blessing for rain in its proper time. According to the Mishnah (Tractate Sukkot 4:9  and 4:10 ) the water for the libation ceremony was drawn from the Pool of Siloam ( Breikhat HaShiloah) in the City of David and carried up the Jerusalem pilgrim road to the Temple. The joy that accompanied this procedure was palpable.

Afterwards, every night in the outer Temple courtyard, tens of thousands of spectators would gather to watch the Simchat Beit HaShoeivah (Rejoicing at the Place of the Water-Drawing), as the most pious members of the community danced and sang songs of praise to God. The dancers would carry lit torches, and were accompanied by the harps, lyres, cymbals and trumpets of the Levites. According to the Mishnah, (Tractate Sukkah 5:1 ), "He who has not seen the rejoicing at the Place of the Water-Drawing has never seen rejoicing in his life." Throughout Sukkot, the city of Jerusalem teemed with Jewish families who came on the holiday pilgrimage and joined together for feasting and Torah study. A partition separating men and women was erected for this occasion.

It was related of Rabban Shimon ben Gamliel that when he was rejoicing with the joy of the Water-Drawing he would take eight burning torches in one hand and toss them upwards; he tossed one and caught one, and never did one touch the other.

Nowadays, this event is recalled via a Simchat Beit HaShoeivah gathering of music, dance, and refreshments. This event takes place in a central location such as a synagogue, yeshiva, or place of study. Refreshments are served in the adjoining sukkah. Live bands often accompany the dancers. The festivities usually begin late in the evening, and can last long into the night.

Jerusalem
In Jerusalem, there is a Simchas Beis HaShoevah at many Hasidic main synagogues on most nights of Sukkos. Particularly the eastern part of Meah Shearim is very busy, with large festivals being held at Karlin, Toldos Aharon, Toldos Avrohom Yitzchok and Breslov. The largest of these is the one at Toldos Aharon. Other places where festivities are held are the main synagogues of Dushinsky and Belz, as well as tens of smaller places around the city.

References

External links 
 Simchas Beis Hashoeiva at Torah.org
 Festival of the Water Libation 5775 -- YouTube video of a reenactment of the Nisukh HaMayim (Water Libation) ritual which Simchat Beit HaShoeivah celebrates. The reenactment took place in Jerusalem during Chol HaMoed Sukkot 5775 (2014).

Sukkot
Tabernacle and Temples in Jerusalem
Hebrew words and phrases in Jewish law
Hebrew names of Jewish holy days